Karijoki is a municipality of Finland.

It is part of the South Ostrobothnia region.

The municipality is unilingually Finnish.

A neanderthal cave, the Wolf cave, was found in the Pyhävuori mountains in Karijoki in 1997.

Villages 
 Alakylä
 Karijoen kirkonkylä
 Myrkky
 Ylikylä

Notable individuals 
 Aarne Ahola, Knight of the Mannerheim Cross No. 71
 Antti Rajamäki, former sprinter
 Erkki Rankaviita, folk musician
 Knut Sonck, dean
 Paul Norrback, accordionist and composer
 Pentti Lund. ice hockey player
 Susanna Rajamäki, athlete

References

External links

Karijoen kunta – The official website of the municipality

Municipalities of South Ostrobothnia